Pearl is a primarily feminine given name derived from the English word pearl, a hard, roundish object produced within the soft tissue of a living, shelled mollusk. Pearls are commonly used in jewelry-making. The pearl is the birthstone for the month of June. Pearls have been associated with innocence and modesty. Because it comes from the sea, it also has associations with the moon and with water. Pearls are also traditionally considered appropriate jewelry for debutantes and brides.

Pearl came into popular use along with other gemstone names during the late Victorian Era.   It may also have been inspired by the name Margaret, which means "pearl". In Nathaniel Hawthorne's 1850 novel The Scarlet Letter, heroine Hester Prynne names her illegitimate daughter Pearl because the child is "of great price, purchased with all she had, her mother's only treasure." The passage refers to the Parable of the Pearl in the New Testament. The gates to Heaven are also commonly pictured as made of pearl. 

It was among the 50 most popular names for girls born in the United States between 1880 and 1911, remained among the top 100 most popular names for girls between 1911 and 1926 and among the top 500 most popular names for girls in the United States until 1960. It was last ranked among the top 1,000 names for girls born in the United States in 1986 before it returned to the top 1,000 in 2007, when it was ranked at No. 993. It has continued to rank among the top 1,000 names for American girls through 2021.  The name was among the top 1,000 names given to boys in the United States between 1880 and 1939. The name was the 223rd most common name for women and girls in the United States in the 1990 census. Authors Pamela Redmond Satran and Linda Rosenkrantz noted in their 2007 book The Baby Name Bible that Pearl is in fashion again with hipster parents in the United States.

Pearl can also be a surname, one which is common among Jews.

Notable people
Pearl Aday (born 1975), American singer-songwriter.
Pearl Bailey (1918–1990), American singer and actress. 
Pearl Buck (1892–1973), American author and novelist
Pearl Connor-Mogotsi (1924–2005), Trinidadian-born theatrical and literary agent
Pearl Fryar (born 1940), American topiary artist
Zane Grey (real name Pearl Grey; 1872–1939), American author and dentist
Pearl Prescod (1920–1966), Tobagonian actress and singer
Pearl Primus (1919-1994), American dancer, choreographer and anthropologist.
John Oliver Hobbes (pen name of Pearl Mary Teresa Richards; 1867-1906), Anglo-American novelist and dramatist

Variants
Gyöngyi (Hungary)
Helmi (Finnish)
Pearla (English)
Pearle (English)
Pearlie (English)
Pearlina (English)
Pearline (English)
Perla (Italian), (Spanish)
Perle (French), (Norwegian)
Perlette (French)
Perley (English)
Perly (English)
Perlezenn (Breton)
Perlie (English)
Perline (French)
Perlita (Spanish)
Πέρλα (Perla) (Greek)

See also
Pearl (surname)
Lu'lu', Arabic name meaning "pearl"

Notes

Feminine given names
English feminine given names
Given names derived from gemstones